Lanto Sheridan (born 15 December 1988), educated at Eton College and University of Oxford, is a British polo player with a handicap of 4.

Sheridan started playing polo in The Pony Club at the age of 9, with which he won the Gannon section at the National Championships at Cowdray. He also won The Baileys Horse Feeds Saddle as the Pony Club Polo Player of the Year.  After leaving school, he played all year round for 5 years, in countries such as Australia, New Zealand, Argentina, Thailand, Barbados and Dubai. In 2010 he played for the Young England Team.

In 2012 he joined Harris Manchester College, Oxford and since then has been a member of the Oxford University Polo Club.  He is the first polo professional to study at Oxford or Cambridge for an undergraduate degree. He is also the very first student who won an Extraordinary Full Blue in polo at Oxford University.

In the 2013 season he played the 18 and 12 goal with the Cowdray Vikings, with whom he has played for the last 5 years.  He also plays for Clarita in the 15 goal Victor Ludorum and with Sportlobster in the 8 and 12 goal at Guards Polo Club.

References

External links
 Best of British Under 25s

1988 births
Living people
English polo players
People educated at Eton College
People associated with Cleary Gottlieb Steen & Hamilton